Antler (born Brad Burdick; 1946 in Wauwatosa, Wisconsin, USA) is an American poet who lives in Wisconsin.

Among other honors, Antler received the Whitman Prize from the Walt Whitman Association, given to the poet "whose contribution best reveals the continuing presence of Walt Whitman in American poetry," in 1985. Antler also was awarded the Witter Bynner prize in 1987. Antler was the poet laureate of the city of Milwaukee, Wisconsin, for 2002 and 2003. He is also an advocate for wilderness protection.

Education and career 
Antler received a bachelor's degree in anthropology from the University of Wisconsin–Milwaukee in 1970. Later he completed a master's degree in English from the same university after spending some time at the noted Iowa Writers' Workshop at the University of Iowa. During the 1970s he also worked at various factory and other jobs just long enough to get money to support his poetry writing and time spent in wilderness areas across the United States.

Antler's first major work, the long poem Factory, was published by Lawrence Ferlinghetti's City Lights Bookstore in 1980. Allen Ginsberg declared him as "one of Whitman's `poets and orators to come'". The collection Last Words appeared in 1986 from Ballantine Books, and Antler: The Selected Poems was published in 2000 by Soft Skull Press. He has also published several chapbooks and has contributed to numerous local, national, and international journals and anthologies.

Writing style 
Antler's work exhibits a punk sensibility, an unabashed sense of humor and a cutting satirical edge. His work reflects the influences of Walt Whitman, Allen Ginsberg, and the American traditions of transcendentalism and environmentalism. He celebrates the wilderness, often comparing urban, industrial life unfavorably with natural phenomena. His frank, sometimes earthy poems frequently exhibit sexual and spiritual energy entwined with the wonder of the natural world.

Books 
Factory - (1980) City Lights
Last Words - (1986) Ballantine
Antler: The Selected Poems - (2000) Soft Skull Press
Touch Each Other - (2013) FootHills Publishing

Awards 
Whitman Award from the Whitman Society of Camden, New Jersey
Witter Bynner Prize from the Academy & Institute of Arts and Letters in New York

References 

 Nelson, Howard. "The Work of Antler." The Hollins Critic, June 1998. Reprinted in Twayne Companion to Contemporary Literature in English, edited by R.H.W. Dillard and Amanda Cockrell, pp. 21–34. New York: Twayne Publishers, 2003.

External links 
Antler, poet and educator. Official web site.

1946 births
Living people
English-language poets
Poets from Wisconsin
Bisexual poets
University of Wisconsin–Milwaukee alumni
Iowa Writers' Workshop alumni
Poets Laureate of Milwaukee
American bisexual writers
Bisexual men
People from Wauwatosa, Wisconsin
21st-century American LGBT people